Bif Bang Pow! is a toy company that makes action figures, bobbleheads, prop replicas, journals, barware, drinkware, coasters, license plate frames and tin totes based on licensed properties.

Bif Bang Pow! was founded in 2005 by Jason Labowitz and Jason Lenzi. Both Labowitz and Lenzi played a role in the creation of their toys. Famed artist Alex Ross has contributed to the Flash Gordon action figure design.

Bif Bang Pow! is particularly notable for its classic 8-inch Mego-style retro action figures, 3-3/4 inch plastic figures, free-standing bobbleheads, and Monitor Mate mini-bobbleheads. Its products were aimed at fans of science fiction and fantasy TV and films in particular, though it also has items of broader appeal, such as The Big Bang Theory and Dexter.

References

Toy companies of the United States
Action figures
2000s toys
2010s toys